X-Dreams is the second solo album by Annette Peacock, released in 1978.

Peacock had spent the previous four years recording material for the album in various studios. She recalled that a total of 22 musicians participated in the creation of the album: "most of them had never played together, and all the tracks were first takes. It was very exciting." Mick Ronson played on tracks 1, 5, 6 and 7. Peacock reflected: "There was an understanding between Mick and I, a mutual respect and admiration." 

In an interview, Peacock stated that she approached the creation of the album as if it were two singles, "like each side was one piece... and the relationship between the two sides was important." Side A (tracks 1–3) was "very hard and aggressive," while side B (tracks 4–7) was "very romantic and kind of sweet."

The song "My Mama Never Taught Me How to Cook" is featured in the film Chasing Amy.

The contents of the album were reissued by Sanctuary Records on the 2004 compilation My Mama Never Taught Me How to Cook: The Aura Years 1978–1982.

Reception 

Thom Jurek of Allmusic said, "there are no weak moments on X-Dreams, and despite its age, the album still sounds a bit ahead of its time."

In an article for Flood Magazine, Ad Amorosi wrote: "X-Dreams is stunning stuff that nearly 45 years after its initial moment has lost none of its punch or import."

Imran Khan, writing for PopMatters, commented: "X-Dreams depicts the endless streams of language found in dreams, a transient moment that has been frozen by the coiled magic of Peacock's words and her uncanny ability to capture an image in sound. Overall, it's a phantasmagorical exercise in harnessing the slipstreams of dreamed noises."

A reviewer for Head Heritage remarked: "Resigning the instrumentation to a battery of both jazz and rock musicians, her songs are all carefully thought out ruminations regarding love, relationships and general man/woman workings that are astonishingly clear and simple as they are frighteningly insightful."

An article at AltRockChick states: "Despite the lengthy, choppy recording 'process,' the gestalt is one of unity, of shared inspiration. X-Dreams is a remarkably engaging record, a full-on aesthetic experience that confirms Annette Peacock's stone-cold original status."

Track listing
All compositions by Annette Peacock except where noted
 "My Mama Never Taught Me How to Cook" 		
 "Real and Defined Androgens" 	
 "Dear Bela"	
 "This Feel Within" 	
 "Too Much in the Skies" 	
 "Don't Be Cruel" (Otis Blackwell, Elvis Presley) 	
 "Questions"

Personnel
 Annette Peacock – vocals, keyboards, synthesizer
 Dave Chambers – saxophone
 George Khan – saxophone
 Ray Warleigh – saxophone
 Peter Lemer – keyboards
 Tom Cosgrove – guitar
 Brian Godding – guitar
 Phil Lee – guitar
 Jim Mullen – guitar
 Mick Ronson – guitar
 Chris Spedding – guitar
 Jeff Clyne – bass
 Steve Cook – bass
 Kuma Harada – bass
 Peter Pavli – bass
 Stu Woods – bass
 Bill Bruford – drums
 John Halsey – drums
 Rick Marotta – drums
 Dave Sheen – drums
 Brother James – congas, percussion
 Darryl Lee Que – congas

Production
 Aaron Sixx – executive producer
 Annette Peacock – producer
 John MacKenzie Burns – engineer 
 Andrew Pearce – assistant engineer
 Bob Carlos Clarke – photography

References 

1978 albums
Annette Peacock albums